Since its inception in 1920, the National Football League (NFL) has played games on Thanksgiving Day, patterned upon the historic playing of college football games on and around the Thanksgiving holiday. The NFL's Thanksgiving Day games have traditionally included one game hosted by the Detroit Lions since 1934, and one game hosted by the Dallas Cowboys since 1966 (with two exceptions in 1975 and 1977). Since 2006, a third prime time game has also been played on Thanksgiving. Unlike the afternoon games, this game has no fixed teams.

In 2022, the NFL branded the Thanksgiving games as the John Madden Thanksgiving Celebration, to honor the memory of head coach and broadcaster John Madden.

History
The concept of American football games being played on Thanksgiving Day dates back to 1876, shortly after the game had been invented, as it was a day that most people had off from work. In that year, the college football teams at Yale and Princeton began an annual tradition of playing each other on Thanksgiving Day.  The University of Michigan also made it a tradition to play annual Thanksgiving games, holding 19 such games from 1885 to 1905. The Thanksgiving Day games between Michigan and the Chicago Maroons in the 1890s have been cited as "The Beginning of Thanksgiving Day Football." In some areas, most commonly in New England, high-school teams play on Thanksgiving, usually to wrap-up the regular-season.

By the time football had become a professional event, playing on Thanksgiving had already become an institution. Records of pro football being played on Thanksgiving date back to as early as the 1890s, with the first pro–am team, the Allegheny Athletic Association of Pittsburgh, Pennsylvania. In 1902, the National Football League, a Major League Baseball-backed organization based entirely in Pennsylvania and unrelated to the current NFL, attempted to settle its championship over Thanksgiving weekend; after the game ended in a tie, eventually all three teams in the league claimed to have won the title. Members of the Ohio League, during its early years, usually placed their marquee matchups on Thanksgiving Day. For instance, in 1905 and 1906 the Latrobe Athletic Association and Canton Bulldogs, considered at the time to be two of the best teams in professional football (along with the Massillon Tigers), played on Thanksgiving. A rigging scandal with the Tigers leading up to the 1906 game led to severe drops in attendance for the Bulldogs and ultimately led to their suspension of operations. During the 1910s, the Ohio League stopped holding Thanksgiving games because many of its players coached high school teams and were unavailable. This was not the case in other regional circuits: in 1919, the New York Pro Football League featured a Thanksgiving matchup between the Buffalo Prospects and the Rochester Jeffersons. The game ended in a scoreless tie, leading to a rematch the next Sunday for the league championship.

Several other NFL teams played regularly on Thanksgiving in the first eighteen years of the league, including the Chicago Bears and Chicago Cardinals (1922–33; the Bears played the Lions from 1934 to 1938 while the Cardinals switched to the Green Bay Packers for 1934 and 1935), Frankford Yellow Jackets, Pottsville Maroons, Buffalo All-Americans, Canton Bulldogs (even after the team moved to Cleveland they played the 1924 Thanksgiving game in Canton), and the New York Giants (1929–38, who always played a crosstown rival). The first owner of the Lions, George A. Richards, started the tradition of the Thanksgiving Day game as a gimmick to get people to go to Lions football games, and to continue a tradition begun by the city's previous NFL teams. What differentiated the Lions' efforts from other teams that played on the holiday was that Richards owned radio station WJR, a major affiliate of the NBC Blue Network (the forerunner to today's American Broadcasting Company); he was able to negotiate an agreement with NBC to carry his Thanksgiving games live across the network.

During the Franksgiving controversy in 1939 and 1940, the only two teams to play the game were the Pittsburgh Steelers and Philadelphia Eagles, as both teams were in the same state (Pennsylvania). (At the time, then-U.S. President Franklin Roosevelt wanted to move the holiday for economic reasons and many states were resistant to the move; half the states recognized the move and the other half did not. This complicated scheduling for Thanksgiving games. Incidentally, the two teams were also exploring the possibility of a merger at the time.) Because of the looming World War II and the resulting shorter seasons, the NFL did not schedule any Thanksgiving games in 1941, nor did it schedule any in the subsequent years until the war ended in 1945. When the Thanksgiving games resumed in 1945, only the Lions' annual home game would remain on the Thanksgiving holiday. In 1951, the Packers began a thirteen-season run as the perpetual opponent to the Lions each year through 1963.

The All-America Football Conference and American Football League, both of which would later be absorbed into the NFL, also held Thanksgiving contests, although neither of those leagues had permanent hosts. Likewise, the AFL of 1926  also played two Thanksgiving games in its lone season of existence, while the AFL of 1936 hosted one in its first season, which featured the Cleveland Rams, a future NFL team, and the 1940–41 incarnation of the American Football League played two games in 1940 on the earlier "Franksgiving" date.

In 1966, the Dallas Cowboys, who had been founded six years earlier, adopted the practice of hosting Thanksgiving games. It is widely rumored that the Cowboys sought a guarantee that they would regularly host Thanksgiving games as a condition of their very first one (since games on days other than Sunday were uncommon at the time and thus high attendance was not a certainty). This is only partly true; Dallas had in fact decided on their own to host games on Thanksgiving because there was nothing else to do or watch on that day. In 1975 and 1977, at the behest of then-Commissioner Pete Rozelle, the St. Louis Cardinals replaced Dallas as a host team (Dallas then hosted St. Louis in 1976). Although the Cardinals, at the time known as the "Cardiac Cards" due to their propensity for winning very close games, were a modest success at the time, they were nowhere near as popular nationwide as the Cowboys, who were regular Super Bowl contenders during this era. This, combined with St. Louis's consistently weak attendance, a series of ugly Cardinals losses in the three-game stretch, and opposition from the Kirkwood–Webster Groves Turkey Day Game (a local high school football contest) led to Dallas resuming regular hosting duties in 1978; it was then, after Rozelle asked Dallas to resume hosting Thanksgiving games, that the Cowboys requested (and received) an agreement guaranteeing the Cowboys a spot on Thanksgiving Day forever.

Since 1978, Thanksgiving games have been hosted in Detroit and Dallas every year, with Detroit in the early time slot and Dallas in the late afternoon slot. Because of television network commitments in place through the 2013 season, to make sure that both the AFC-carrying network (NBC from 1965 to 1997, and CBS since 1998) and the NFC-carrying network (CBS from 1956 to 1993, and Fox since 1994) got at least one game each, one of these games was between NFC opponents, and one featured AFC-NFC opponents. Thus, the AFC could showcase only one team on Thanksgiving, and the AFC team was always the visiting team.

Since 2006, a third NFL game on Thanksgiving has been played in primetime. It originally aired on the NFL Network as part of its Thursday Night Football package until 2011, when the game was moved to NBC's Sunday Night Football package under the NFL's current television deals. The night game has never had any conference tie-ins, meaning the league can place any game into the time slot. Since NBC took over the primetime game in 2012, divisional matchups have been normally scheduled, with the exceptions being in 2016, 2021 and 2022. In 2014, a series of changes to the broadcast contracts freed CBS from its obligation to carry an AFC team; by 2018, the last vestiges of conference ties to the Thanksgiving games were eliminated (in practice, games on Fox remain all-NFC contests).

The originally scheduled 2020 primetime game between the Baltimore Ravens and the Pittsburgh Steelers was postponed to the following Wednesday, December 2, after multiple Baltimore players and staff tested positive for COVID-19 in the days before the game. This thus marked the first time no primetime contest was held since 2005.

On November 11, 2022, the league announced that the Thanksgiving games will be branded as the "John Madden Thanksgiving Celebration", honoring the memory of head coach and broadcaster John Madden. Madden called 20 Thanksgiving games during his broadcasting career.

Throwback uniforms
Since  teams playing on Thanksgiving have worn throwback uniforms on numerous occasions. In 2002, it extended to nearly all games of the weekend, and in some cases also involved classic field logos at the stadiums.

From 2001 to 2003, Dallas chose to represent the 1990s Cowboys dynasty by wearing the navy "Double-Star" jersey not seen since 1995. In , the team wore uniforms not seen since . In 2009, to celebrate the 50th anniversary of the AFL, both Dallas and Oakland played in a "AFL Legacy Game." In 2013, the Cowboys intended to wear their 1960s throwbacks, but chose not to do so after the NFL adopted a new policy requiring players and teams to utilize only one helmet a season to address the league's new concussion protocol; rather than sport an incomplete throwback look, the Cowboys instead wore their standard blue jerseys at home for the first time since 1963. In 2015, the Cowboys resurrected their 1994 white  "Double-Star" jerseys only this time wore them with white pants as part of the league's Color Rush, a trial run of specially-designed, monochromatic jerseys to be worn during Thursday games. In 2022, after the NFL lifted the one-helmet rule, the Cowboys resumed wearing the throwback navy "Double-Star" jerseys on Thanksgiving.

In 2001–2004, and again in 2008, 2010, 2017, 2018 and 2021 the Detroit Lions have worn throwback uniforms based on their very early years. For 2019 and 2022, Detroit wore its silver Color Rush uniforms.

Memorable games
1920: An urban legend states that the Chicago Tigers and Decatur Staleys challenged each other to a Thanksgiving duel, in Chicago, in the league's inaugural season, with the loser being relegated out of the league at the end of the season, purportedly explaining why the Tigers were the only NFL team to fold after the 1920 season (no other team would fold until 1921). The claims of it being a duel are unsubstantiated; nevertheless, the Tigers, after a 27–0 win over the non-league Thorn Tornadoes the next week, never played football again. The Staleys would move to Chicago during the next season, later renaming themselves the Bears.
1921: In a matchup of two of the league's best teams, the Chicago Staleys lost to the Buffalo All-Americans at home. The Staleys demanded a rematch, with Buffalo agreeing to a December match only on the terms of it being considered an off-the-record exhibition game. That later match, which Chicago won, ended up counting despite the All-Americans' insistence, controversially handing Chicago the championship.
 1929: Ernie Nevers scored 40 points—an NFL record that still stands, and the entirety of the Chicago Cardinals' scoring that day (including the extra points)—in a rout over their crosstown rivals the Chicago Bears, who scored only 6 points.
1952: The Dallas Texans were forced to move their lone remaining home game to the Rubber Bowl in Akron, Ohio as the undercard to a high school football contest. Their opponent for that game, the Chicago Bears, underestimated the then-winless Texans and sent their second string team to the game; the Texans scored a 27–23 upset over the Bears for their only win of their existence.
1962: The Detroit Lions handed the 10–0 Green Bay Packers their lone defeat of the season, 26–14. The game was dubbed the "Thanksgiving Day Massacre" due to the dominant performance by the Lions defense, who sacked Bart Starr 11 times.
1964–65: The 1964 and 1965 AFL contests featured the Buffalo Bills and the San Diego Chargers, the two teams that would eventually meet in those years' American Football League Championship Games. Buffalo won the 1964 Thanksgiving game 27–24 and the 1965 game ended in a 20-20 tie. Both games were played at Balboa Stadium in San Diego.
1969: In a blinding snowstorm at Tiger Stadium, the Minnesota Vikings blanked the Lions 27–0, featuring an interception by Jim Marshall, who lateraled to Alan Page on the return, resulting in a touchdown.
1974: Dallas Cowboys backup quarterback Clint Longley took over for an injured Roger Staubach with the team down 16–3 and rallied them to an improbable 24–23 victory over the Washington Redskins on two deep passes.
1976: The Buffalo offense put forth one of the best and the worst performances in Thanksgiving history. O. J. Simpson set the NFL record for most rushing yards in a single game, with 273. However, Bills backup quarterback Gary Marangi—playing in relief of Joe Ferguson and himself battling shoulder injuries—completed only 4 of 21 pass attempts, for 29 yards passing, no touchdowns (one was called back on a penalty) and a rating of 19.7. Detroit defeated the Bills 27–14. In a 2022 interview, Simpson, Marangi and Joe DeLamielleure expressed embarrassment over the game (part of a rebuilding season in which Bills coach Lou Saban quit midseason, Jim Ringo went winless as Saban's replacement and their star receivers had been traded away), noting that Simpson had broken a record he already held at the time (which Simpson compared to "kissing your sister") and that he had more pride in other games the Bills won with Simpson rushing for over 200 yards, despite not setting records.
1980: With the Lions and Bears tied 17–17 at the end of regulation, the game went to overtime, the first Thanksgiving game to do so (overtime was not added to the NFL regular season until 1974), and the first overtime game at the Silverdome. Bears running back Dave Williams returned the fifth-quarter opening kickoff 95 yards for a game-winning touchdown, ending the shortest overtime period in NFL history at the time (13 seconds).
1986: The Lions and the Packers had the second-highest scoring game in Thanksgiving history (the highest-scoring game came in 1951). It was the best day of receiver Walter Stanley's career; Stanley netted 207 all-purpose yards and three touchdowns, including an 83-yard punt return to win the game for Green Bay, 44–40. Stanley had an otherwise undistinguished career in the NFL.
1989: In what was known as the "Bounty Bowl", the Philadelphia Eagles crushed the Cowboys by a score of 27–0. Allegations surfaced that the Eagles had placed a bounty on the Cowboys kicker, thus becoming the first of a string of three bitterly contested games between the two teams, the other two being Bounty Bowl II and the Porkchop Bowl a year later.
1993:  In one of the more famous Thanksgiving Day games in recent history, Dallas led the Miami Dolphins 14–13 with just seconds remaining in a rare, snow-filled Texas Stadium. Miami's Pete Stoyanovich attempted a game winning 40-yard field goal that was blocked by the Cowboys' Jimmie Jones. Dick Enberg (who was calling the game for NBC) proclaimed "The Cowboys will win." Indeed, since the kick landed beyond the line of scrimmage, once the ball stopped moving the play would be declared dead and Dallas would gain possession. However, the ball landed and began spinning on its tip, leading Cowboys lineman Leon Lett to try to gain possession. Lett slipped, fell, and knocked the ball forward. By rule, the ball was live and the Dolphins fell on it at the two yard line. With the recovery, Stoyanovich got a second chance to win the game and he hit the much shorter field goal. The Dolphins won 16–14.
1994: Troy Aikman was injured and third-string quarterback (and future Cowboys head coach) Jason Garrett was forced to start for Dallas against the Packers. The Cowboys won a 42–31 shoot-out against Brett Favre.
1998: In another controversial Thanksgiving Day game, the Pittsburgh Steelers and the Lions went to overtime tied 16–16. Pittsburgh's Jerome Bettis called the coin toss in the air, but head referee Phil Luckett declared Detroit the winner of the toss after Bettis reportedly said "He...tails." Luckett concluded Bettis' call was "heads", but Bettis insisted he had said "tails." The Lions elected to receive, and they went on to kick a field goal on the first possession, winning 19–16. As a result of the fiasco, officials are now required to confirm a captain's call before tossing the coin, and at least two officials must be involved in each toss. A later rule change now prevents teams from automatically winning a game by scoring a field goal on the first possession. The day also saw a memorable performance by Minnesota in a 46–36 win over Dallas as Vikings rookie Randy Moss caught three touchdowns, all of over 50 yards.
2008: The 10–1 Tennessee Titans routed the 0–11 Lions by a score of 47–10, one of the most lopsided results in history on Thanksgiving. The Lions would go on to finish the season 0–16, clinching the 33rd winless season in NFL history, the ninth since 1930, and the first under the 16-game schedule.
2011: The trio of games was lauded as one of the better Thanksgiving Day slates of games in NFL history as Green Bay defeated Detroit 27–15, Dallas edged Miami 20–19 and Baltimore beat San Francisco 16–6. The night game pitted head coaches and Harbaugh brothers John of the Ravens and Jim of the 49ers against each other – a preview of the next year's Super Bowl XLVII.
2012: The prime time contest became infamous for the "Butt fumble", an incident in which New York Jets quarterback Mark Sanchez ran headfirst into the buttocks of Brandon Moore, one of his own offensive linemen. He subsequently fumbled the ball; and it was recovered by the New England Patriots, who immediately returned it for a touchdown, part of 35 second quarter points by the Patriots in a one-sided 49–19 victory. In an earlier game, one of the NFL's most infamous rule changes came when former Lions head coach Jim Schwartz challenged a play in which Houston Texans running back Justin Forsett's knee clearly touched the ground before sprinting for an 81-yard touchdown. Referee Walt Coleman stated that, by rule, scoring plays are automatically reviewed and the play was not challengeable by a coach. Because of the improperly attempted challenge, the review was cancelled and Coleman assessed a 15-yard kickoff penalty for unsportsmanlike conduct. The NFL then passed a new rule that stated that if a coach attempted to challenge a play that is automatically reviewed, the review would continue. It was called the 'Jim Schwartz rule'. Houston won the game 34–31 in overtime.
2022: In a game nicknamed "23 Seconds" or "21 Seconds" in homage to the 13 Seconds playoff game the year before, Buffalo defeated Detroit 28–25 on an end-of-game drive that elapsed 21 of the last 23 seconds off the game clock, culminating in the winning field goal by Tyler Bass with two seconds remaining.

Home team controversy
It has remained a tradition for Dallas and Detroit to host the afternoon games dating several decades. Other teams eventually expressed interest in hosting Thanksgiving games. Lamar Hunt, the former owner of the Chiefs (who had hosted Thanksgiving games from 1967 to 1969 as an AFL team prior to the merger), lobbied heavily in favor of his team hosting a game on the holiday. When the NFL adopted a third, prime time game, the Chiefs were selected as the first team to host such a contest, but the team was not made a permanent host, and Hunt's death shortly after the 2006 contest ended the lobbying on behalf of the team.

The host issue came to a head in 2008, focusing particularly on the winless Lions. Going into the game, Detroit had lost their last four Thanksgiving games, and opinions amongst the media had suggested removing Detroit and replacing them with a more attractive matchup. The team also required an extension to prevent a local television blackout. The Lions were routed by Tennessee 47–10, en route to the team's 0–16 season. NFL commissioner Roger Goodell confirmed that the Lions would stay on Thanksgiving for the 2009 season, but kept the issue open to revisit in the future.

Conversely, the Dallas Cowboys, who typically represent a larger television draw, have had many fewer public calls to be replaced on Thanksgiving. One issue that has been debated is a perceived unfair advantage of playing at home on Thanksgiving. The advantage is given in the form of an extra day of practice for the home team while the road team has to travel to the game site.  This is true for most Thursday games, but with the night games, the visitor can travel to the game site after practice on Wednesday and hold the final walkthrough the following morning.

With the introduction of the prime time game, which effectively allows all teams in the league an opportunity to play on Thanksgiving, along with the introduction of year-long Thursday Night Football ensuring all teams have one Thursday game during the regular season (thus negating any on-field advantages or disadvantages to being selected for Thanksgiving), the calls for Detroit and Dallas to be removed have diminished.

Broadcasting

This was to satisfy the then-television contract balance between the network holding the rights to the "AFC package" and televised inter-conference games in which the visiting team is from the AFC (NBC from 1970 to 1997, and CBS since 1998) and the network with the "NFC package" (CBS from 1970 to 1993, and Fox since 1994).

In , the third game in primetime originally aired on the NFL Network. In , NBC took over broadcasting the primetime game, and ever since all three broadcast networks with Sunday NFL rights carry one Thanksgiving game apiece. The first two games continue to be split between CBS and Fox, with CBS getting the 12:30 p.m. (EST) Detroit "early" game, and Fox getting the 4:30 p.m. Dallas "late" game in even-numbered years, and Fox getting the "early" game and CBS the "late" game in odd-numbered years.

In 2014, a system known as "cross-flex" was introduced, in which the two networks bound by conference restrictions, CBS and Fox, could carry games from the other conference as part of their Sunday afternoon package, including the potential for CBS to broadcast an NFC vs. NFC game on Thanksgiving. From that year through 2016, CBS carried all-NFC contests every year on Thanksgiving, and in 2014, 2015, and 2018, no AFC teams played in any of the Thanksgiving games. To date, the NFL has never assigned an AFC road game to Fox on Thanksgiving.

Westwood One most recently held national radio broadcast rights to all three games, with Compass Media Networks sharing rights to the Cowboys contest. (Under league rules, only radio stations that carry at least 12 Cowboys games in a season are allowed to carry the Compass broadcast.) The participating teams also air the games on their local flagship stations and regional radio networks.

The Cowboys' Thanksgiving game has regularly been the most watched NFL regular season telecast each year, with the Lions' Thanksgiving game usually in the top five.

Game results
(Winning teams are denoted by boldface type; tie games are italicized.)

1920–1940
All three of the generally recognized iterations of the American Football League that played during this era (AFL I in 1926, AFL II in 1936 and AFL III in 1940) played Thanksgiving games, which are also listed as indicated.
Non-NFL team games between league teams and non league teams counted in the 1920 standings. The All-Tonawanda Lumberjacks later joined the league as the Tonawanda Kardex, albeit only for one game.
Thanksgiving fell on the final Thursday in November until 1938 and was held on two conflicting days from 1939 to 1941.

1945–1959
No Thanksgiving games were held from 1941 to 1944 due to World War II.
Thanksgiving games were played on the fourth Thursday in November from 1945 onward.
The All-America Football Conference (AAFC) also played Thanksgiving games from 1946 to 1949.

1960–1969
The American Football League (AFL) also played Thanksgiving Day games during this decade.
The Dallas Cowboys started playing their traditional series in 1966.

1970–2005
They were held at Detroit and Dallas, with the Lions hosting the "early" game (12:30 p.m. EST) and the Cowboys holding the "late" game (initially at 4:00 p.m. EST, then moved to 4:15 p.m. EST in 1998). Detroit always hosted the "early" game because a 12:30 p.m. EST kick-off at Dallas would be 11:30 a.m. local time (CST), and the NFL avoids starting games before noon locally. Detroit's 12:30 p.m. "early" game kickoff is also thirty minutes earlier than the typical afternoon start time of 1:00 p.m., limiting the overlapping of the two games.
The two games initially rotated annually as intra-conference (NFC at NFC) and inter-conference (AFC at NFC) games. This was to satisfy the then-television contract balance between the network holding the rights to the "AFC package" and televised inter-conference games in which the visiting team is from the AFC (NBC from 1970 to 1997, and CBS since 1998) and the network with the "NFC package" (CBS from 1970 to 1993, and Fox since 1994).
CBS and NBC initially started their Thanksgiving pregame coverage thirty minutes before kickoff of their respective games, similar to their thirty-minute pregame coverage on Sunday afternoons. After Fox acquired NFL rights in 1994, and debuted the hour-long Fox NFL Sunday pregame show, they also started their hour-long pregame coverage at 11:30 a.m. when televising the Detroit "early" game, but kept a thirty-minute pregame show when televising the Dallas "late" game. When CBS reacquired NFL rights in 1998, they still started their The NFL Today pregame coverage at 12:00 p.m. when televising the Detroit "early" game due to the fact that their morning parade coverage ran until noon.
Because of the Missouri Turkey Day Game, the long-established Kirkwood–Webster Groves high school football game that takes place on Thanksgiving in St. Louis, weak fan support in St. Louis, and general national preference of the Cowboys over the historically weaker Cardinals, the Cardinals' hosting of the Thanksgiving game was not popular. Dallas returned to hosting the game in 1978 and has hosted since. Likewise, the Rams never played on Thanksgiving while in St. Louis, in part because of the Turkey Day Game and also because the Missouri State High School Activities Association held its state football championship games on Thanksgiving weekend at The Dome at America's Center from 1996-2015. 
After the NFL division realignment in 2002, no team from the AFC North could play a Thanksgiving Day game against the traditional hosts. This was because under the current rotation, the Cowboys and the Lions each play AFC North teams in years that Fox is scheduled to broadcast its Thanksgiving Day game, requiring an NFC opponent. The last game to feature a team currently in the AFC North was the Lions matchup against the Pittsburgh Steelers in 1998. AFC North teams could play in the prime time game, as the Bengals did in 2010.

2006–present
Since , three contests have been scheduled for Thanksgiving. In addition to the traditional Detroit and Dallas home afternoon games, a third game is now played in primetime and televised by NFL Network (2006–) or NBC (since ). The third game's start times have generally been the same as other primetime games, with pregame coverage beginning at 8:00 p.m. EST and kickoff at 8:20 p.m. EST. The primetime game is hosted by a different team (other than the Lions and Cowboys) each season.
The Kansas City Chiefs hosted the Denver Broncos in the first "Thanksgiving Tripleheader" primetime game in 2006.
 In , the Dallas game's kickoff time was moved from 4:15 p.m. EST to 4:30 p.m. EST, with the networks also moving their pregame coverage for that game to 4:00 p.m. EST.
The  season was the first in which CBS no longer had to air an inter-conference (AFC at NFC) Thanksgiving game. Instead, all three games featured NFC vs. NFC opponents for the first time.
The originally scheduled  primetime divisional rivalry game between the Baltimore Ravens and the Pittsburgh Steelers was postponed to Sunday, November 29 and eventually again to Wednesday, December 2 after multiple Baltimore players and staff tested positive for COVID-19 in the days before the game. This marked the first time no Thanksgiving prime time contest was held since 2005.

Game standings
Of current NFL franchises. This includes American Football League (AFL) games; however, it does not include All-America Football Conference (AAFC) games.

Notable appearance droughts

An idiosyncrasy in the NFL's current scheduling formula, which has been in effect in its basic form since 2002, effectively prevented teams from the AFC North from playing at the Lions or Cowboys on Thanksgiving. The formula had the AFC North playing at Dallas or at Detroit in years when other divisions were slated to fill the AFC slot on Thanksgiving. These teams, under the television contracts in place at the time, could only play in the third (night) game. With changes in the scheduling practices in 2014 ("cross-flexing"), the division is no longer barred from participating in one of the afternoon games. Even with cross-flexing available, an AFC North team has yet to play at Detroit or Dallas on Thanksgiving, and all of the AFC North's appearances have thus far been in the night game.

The Los Angeles Rams have the longest active appearance drought of any team, with their last appearance coming in 1975.

Since 2010, several appearance droughts have ended. New Orleans, Cincinnati, Baltimore, Houston, and Carolina all played their first Thanksgiving games during this time frame. San Francisco likewise played their first Thanksgiving game since 1972 in 2011. The Los Angeles Chargers, who last played on the holiday in 1969 (while the team was still an AFL franchise in San Diego), appeared for the first time as an NFL member in 2017.

Thanksgiving Day records of defunct teams
League teams only, since 1920.

*All-America Football Conference team.

Most frequent match-ups among active teams

Game MVPs

Since 1989, informal and sometimes lighthearted Man of the Match/MVP awards have been issued by the networks broadcasting the respective games. Running back Emmitt Smith holds the record for most Thanksgiving MVPs with five (1990, 1992, 1994, 1996, 2002), followed by Tony Romo with four (2006, 2007, 2009, 2013). Among players not from Detroit or Dallas, Josh Allen, Drew Brees and Brett Favre each hold three. Voting on the respective awards is typically done informally by the announcing crew, and criteria are loose. Noteworthy statistical accomplishments weigh heavily, and "group" awards are not uncommon. The announcement of the winner(s), and the presentation of the award is normally done immediately following the game, during post-game network coverage.

Turkey Leg Award (CBS & Fox)
In , John Madden of CBS awarded the first "Turkey Leg Award", for the game's most valuable player. Pursuant to its name, it was an actual cooked turkey leg, and players typically took a celebratory bite out of the leg for the cameras during post-game interviews. Reggie White of the Eagles was the first recipient. The gesture was seen mostly as an amusing gimmick tied to the holiday and relating to Madden's famous multi-legged turkeys and turduckens. Since then, however, the award has gained notoriety.

Because of the loose and informal nature of the award, at times it has been awarded to multiple players. On one occasion (1994) it was given to players from both teams.

Later Fox awards
When John Madden left Fox after 2001, the network introduced a new award starting in 2002, named the Galloping Gobbler. It was represented by a small silver figurine of a cartoonish turkey wearing a football helmet striking a Heisman-like pose. Much like Cleatus and Digger, the original Galloping Gobbler trophy reflected Fox's irreverent mascots, and went through several iterations. Unimpressed by its tackiness, Emmitt Smith famously threw the 2002 award into a trash can.

In 2007, the kitschy statuette was replaced with a bronze-colored statue of a nondescript turkey holding a football. In 2011, the trophies were discarded altogether and replaced by a commemorative plaque. Unlike the aforementioned "Turkey Leg Award", the Galloping Gobbler was normally awarded to only one player annually, however in 2016, co-winners were honored.

For 2017, the Galloping Gobbler was permanently retired, and replaced with the "Game Ball", a stylish, ornate football-shaped trophy, reminiscent of the tradition where game-used balls are typically awarded to players of the game. For 2019–2020 (coinciding with Fox's new partnership with WWE SmackDown), the "Game Ball" was replaced by a WWE Championship Belt. The "Game Ball" returned in 2021.

All-Iron Award (CBS)
The All-Iron winner also received a skillet of blackberry cobbler made by Simms' mother.

Through 2006, the trophy was only awarded to one player annually. Occasionally, it was issued as a "group award". In 2008, Simms stated it was "too close to call" and named four players to the trophy; he then gave the award to several people every year until 2013, after which he reverted to a single MVP in 2014.

Simms was removed from the broadcast booth for the 2017 season in favor of Tony Romo, who did not carry on the tradition. Instead, the "Chevrolet Player of the Game" award was extended to CBS' Thanksgiving Day game. As in CBS' regular Sunday afternoon NFL coverage as well as Fox's regular NFL coverage, Chevrolet will donate money in the player's name to the United Way if the game is played in Detroit, or the Salvation Army if the Thanksgiving Day game is played in Dallas.

For the 2019 season, CBS revived the Turkey Leg Award, awarding it to Josh Allen.

Prime time games (NFLN & NBC)
During the time when NFL Network held the broadcast rights the prime time game, from 2007 to 2011 they gave out the "Pudding Pie Award" for MVPs. The award was an actual pie. In 2009, NFL Network gave Brandon Marshall a pumpkin pie rather than the chocolate pudding pie of the previous two years.

NBC, which carried Thanksgiving afternoon games through 1997, did not issue an MVP award during that time. NBC began broadcasting the Thanksgiving prime time game in 2012, at which point the MVP award was added. From 2012 to 2015, the NBC award was referred to as the "Madden Thanksgiving Player-of-the-Game", honoring John Madden (who announced NBC games from 2006 to 2008). The award then became the Sunday Night Football on Thanksgiving Night Player of the Game in 2016. It is typically awarded to multiple players on the winning team. In the first few years, the award specifically went to players on both offense and defense, but in recent years, there have been no quotas for each phase. The winning players are presented with ceremonial game balls and, as a gesture to Madden, a cooked turkey leg. The 2021 award also featured a turkey leg statuette in addition to legs prepared and seasoned by local chef (and former NBC star) Emeril Lagasse.

Madden Player of the Game (2022 to the present)
As part of the new "John Madden Thanksgiving Celebration" branding in 2022, the league announced that each network will now select a "Madden Player of the Game", with the NFL Foundation donating $10,000 in each winner's name to a youth or high school football program of their choice. Turkey legs continue to be awarded to the players of the game in homage to Madden.

Complete list

2007: Of the members of the Cowboys defense, Chris Canty, DeMarcus Ware, Terence Newman and Greg Ellis were particularly noted.
2017: No formal CBS award was given. Philip Rivers and Keenan Allen (both of the Chargers) were interviewed during post-game coverage.
2018: No formal CBS award was given. Chase Daniel (Bears) was interviewed during post-game coverage.
2020: The CBS award was sent to Deshaun Watson's home instead of being handed out after the game.
2020: No NBC prime time game was held due to a COVID-19 outbreak.

See also
American football on Thanksgiving
National Football League Christmas games

Notes

References

Bibliography
2003 NFL Record and Fact Book (for game results through 2002)
Detroit Lions 2003, 2004 and 2005 game schedules (for game results 2003 to 2005)
Dallas Cowboys 2003, 2004 and 2005 game schedules (for game results 2003 to 2005)

External links
NFL.com Thanksgiving
Thanksgiving Day Game Results, from the Pro Football Hall of Fame
American Football League Thanksgiving game boxscores

 
History of the National Football League
Thanksgiving
American Football League
Thanksgiving (United States)
Detroit Lions
Dallas Cowboys
Recurring sporting events established in 1920
1920 establishments in the United States
November sporting events